SkyKing is the name of two airlines:

 SkyKing Limited, a defunct airline formerly based on the Turks and Caicos Islands (merged into Air Turks and Caicos)
 Sky King, Inc., a charter airline based in the United States

People
 Nickname for Richard Russell, American airport ground operator involved in the 2018 Horizon Air Q400 incident

Other
Emergency Action Message